Parkland High School is a large public high school in South Whitehall Township, near Allentown, Pennsylvania. The school serves students in grades 9–12 and is the only high school for the Parkland School District.

As of the 2021-22 school year, the school had an enrollment of 3,171 students, according to National Center for Education Statistics data.

History

Parkland High School was formed in 1949 when North Whitehall Township and South Whitehall Township merged to create Parkland Union School District, with Upper Macungie Township joining in 1950. Its predecessor, South Whitehall High School, was housed in the current day Troxell Building. Parkland used the same facility until a larger building on Route 309 in Orefield was completed in 1954, which served as the high school for 45 years.

In 1999, the new and current Parkland High School building on Cedar Crest Boulevard was opened due to overcapacity of the Orefield building. The old school was renovated and renamed Orefield Middle School, replacing Troxell Junior High School. When viewed from above, the layout of the current building and grounds closely approximate the shape of the Millennium Falcon, a spacecraft featured in the Star Wars films.  School officials claim that the design was not deliberate. The Parkland High School campus comprises 128 acres and was built with three entrances: One entrance for the main academic and administration entrance, one for the cafeteria and gymnasium, and one for the auditorium. The entrances are labeled by academics, athletics, and arts.

Athletics

Parkland competes athletically in the Eastern Pennsylvania Conference (EPC) in the Pennsylvania Interscholastic Athletic Association, one of the premier high school athletic divisions in the nation. Cumulatively among all of its sports, Parkland has secured fourteen Pennsylvania state championship titles.

Baseball
The baseball program has won 17 conference championships and 7 district titles. The program has 11 athletes that have been inducted to the Parkland High School Hall of Fame. The program has a record of 854-416-1 with a winning percentage of 0.672% in 73 seasons.

Basketball (Boys)
The boys basketball team has won 6 conference championships and 10 district titles. There have been 7 players inducted into the Parkland High School Hall of Fame. The program has had 8 1,000 point scorers. The program as a entirety has a record of 1,145-698 with a winning percentage of 0.621% in its 74 seasons.

Basketball (Girls)
The Parkland Girls basketball team has an overall record throughout program history of 807-621 which has a winning percentage of 0.565%. The program has 8 1,000 point scorers throughout the program with the most recent being in the 2006-2007 season. The program has 3 conference championships, 4 district championships, and 1 state title which was in the 2004-2005 season.

Cross country (Girls)
The Parkland girls cross country team has a record of 449-179-2 over 40 seasons with a winning percentage of 0.714%. The program has won 7 conference championships, 5 district championships, and 1 state title. They have 3 athletes that have been inducted into the Parkland Hall of Fame.

Football
The football program at Parkland High School has won 18 conference championships, 10 district titles, and 1 state titles in its 69 years as a program. Their overall record is 454-269-21 with a winning percentage of 0.624%. There are 30 athletes that have been inducted into the Parkland Hall of Fame, 29 athletes with 1,000 rushing yards, 16 athletes with 1,000 passing yards and 1 athlete with 1,000 receiving yards.

Ice hockey
Parkland High School also is one of eleven Lehigh Valley-area high schools with an ice hockey team; the team competes in the Lehigh Valley Scholastic Ice Hockey League.

Soccer (Boys)
The Parkland boys soccer team has a overall record of 615-303-48 with a winning percentage of 0.661% over 47 seasons as a program. They have won 11 conference championships and 9 district championships. 13 athletes have been inducted into the hall of fame and the most recent being two athletes inducted in 2017-2018. The most league wins for the program was 17 which occurred in 2002. The most overall wins occurred in 1998 with 25. The most goals scored by the team in a single season is 115 and the fewest goals allowed in a season was 10. The best record the team has had was 17-0. The most goals by an athlete in a season was 39 and was completed by Josh Ottinger in 2000. The most assists was 23 completed by JC Tishishimbi in 2005. The most points was also completed by Josh Ottinger with 89 and the most shutouts in a season was 19 by Rob Weisel in 1998

Softball
The Parkland softball program has a record of 912-241 with a winning percentage of 0.791% over 53 seasons. They have won 5 state titles, 27 conference championships, and 16 district titles. They have had 20 athletes inducted into the hall of fame.

Swimming and diving (Boys)
The swimming program has won 8 conference championships and 12 district championships. The program has a winning percentage of 0.724% with a record of 508-192-5 over 62 seasons.

Swimming and diving (Girls)
The girls swimming and diving program has a program overall record of 545-124-2 with a winning percentage of 0.814%. The program has won 19 conference titles, 25 district championships, and 3 state titles in its 54 seasons. The program has 40 athletes that are in the Parkland Hall of Fame.

Tennis (Boys)
The boys tennis program at Parkland has three athletes that have been inducted into the Parkland Hall of Fame. they have a winning record with a winning percentage of 0.814%. They have won 671 matches, lost 151, and dragged 5. They have one 23 conference championships and 11 district titles.

Tennis (Girls)
The girls tennis program has a winning percentage of 0.827% with 633-132 with 18 conference championships and 11 district titles. They have had one athlete inducted into the Parkland Hall of Fame in the 2011-2012 season.

Volleyball (Boys)
In 2015, the boys volleyball team won the PIAA state championships. The boys volleyball team has won 13 conference championships, 10 district championships, and 1 state title in its 36 seasons as a program. The program has produced 24 athletes into the Parkland High School hall of fame. The volleyball program as a whole has a record of 507-164 with a winning percentage of 0.756%.

Volleyball (Girls)
In 2011, 2014, and 2015, the girls volleyball team won the PIAA AAA state championships. The girls volleyball program at Parkland High School has 9 conference championships, 11 district championships, and three state championships. The girls team has had 27 girls inducted to the Parkland Hall of Fame. The record over 42 seasons for the girls volleyball program is 577-289 with a win percentage of 0.666%

Academics 
Parkland High School offers 25 AP courses, including AP literature, AP psychology, AP statistics, AP spanish, AP calculus, and others. The AP exam pass rate 86%. The school has an average SAT score of 1240 and average ACT score of 29. The average graduation rate at Parkland is 95%. The state testing scores have an average of 86% in reading and 80% in mathematics. Parkland High School has about 3,187 students enrolled in grades 9-12 as of the 2020-21 school year. The student to teacher ratio is 17-1. Parkland High School is ranked 123 in the state of Pennsylvania. About a quarter of the students participate in some type of AP classes.

Notable alumni
Brick Bronsky, former actor and professional wrestler
David L. Calhoun, president and chief executive officer of Boeing 
Michaela Conlin, actress, Fox's Bones
Greg DeLong, former professional football player, Baltimore Ravens, Jacksonville Jaguars and Minnesota Vikings
Billy Kidman, former professional wrestler
Carmen Maria Machado, short story author, essayist, and critic
Antoinette Maniatty, materials science professor
Tim Massaquoi, former professional football player, Miami Dolphins
Aimee Mullins, actress, World Trade Center
Chris Renaud, director, Despicable Me, Despicable Me 2, The Lorax, and The Secret Life of Pets
Adam Richman, indie pop singer<ref>"Pop singer EJ emotionally battered no more", The Morning Call, June 9, 2005</ref>
Donald Snyder, former member of Pennsylvania House of Representatives
Andrea Tantaros, former Fox News television commentator
Brant Weidner, former professional basketball player, San Antonio Spurs
Lauren Weisberger, author, The Devil Wears Prada''
Andre Williams, former professional football player, New York Giants and Los Angeles Chargers, and 2014 Heisman Trophy finalist
Joshua Wolson, U.S. federal judge, U.S. District Court for the Eastern District
Kenny Yeboah, professional football player, New York Jets

References

External links

Parkland High School profile at Niche

1949 establishments in Pennsylvania
Educational institutions established in 1949
Public high schools in Pennsylvania
Schools in Lehigh County, Pennsylvania